Trevor Jude Smith is an American ukulele player sometimes associated with the New York Anti-folk scene. He has performed or recorded with dozens of independent and national artists including Major Matt Mason USA, Dufus, Rachel Trachtenburg, Toby Goodshank, and Amory Sivertson.

References

External links 
 Antifolk.net Artist Page

American ukulele players
Living people
Year of birth missing (living people)
Musicians from Brooklyn